Hospitality International is a chain of hotels and motels in the United States and Canada. Their brands include Red Carpet Inn and Scottish Inns.

History
Hospitality International was founded in 1985 when the Red Carpet Inn and Scottish Inns chains merged. It was first headquartered in Biloxi, Mississippi before moving to Tucker, Georgia.

Brands
Downtowner Inns, a limited-service brand with four locations
Master Host Inns, a mix of hotels and resorts with four locations
Passport Inns, a limited-service brand with 14 locations
Red Carpet Inn, a mix of limited and full-service properties with 108 locations
Scottish Inns, a limited-service brand with 113 locations

Loyalty program
The "INNCentive Card" offers guests a 10% discount on all stays at participating Hospitality International properties.

References

External links
 - stayhihotels
 - hifranchise

Companies based in Tucker, Georgia
Hotel chains in Canada
Hotel chains in the United States
Hospitality companies
Hospitality companies established in 1985
1985 establishments in Mississippi